Davidescu is a Romanian surname. Notable people with the surname include:

Gheorghe Davidescu (1892–1959), Romanian lawyer and diplomat
Nicolae Davidescu (1888–1954), Romanian symbolist poet and novelist

Romanian-language surnames
Patronymic surnames
Surnames from given names